Earthy may refer to:

 Soil or earth
 Earthy (Bobby Darin album)
 Earthy (Kenny Burrell album), 1957
 Earthy (wine), a wine tasting descriptor